Malaya Sosnova is a rural locality (a selo) in Bolshesosnovskoye Rural Settlement, Bolshesosnovsky District, Perm Krai, Russia. The population was 360 as of 2010. There are 13 streets.

Geography 
Malaya Sosnova is located 6 km southeast of Bolshaya Sosnova (the district's administrative centre) by road. Bolshaya Sosnova is the nearest rural locality.

References 

Rural localities in Bolshesosnovsky District